Hoplolaimus uniformis is a plant pathogenic nematode affecting carrots.

See also 
 List of carrot diseases

References 

Tylenchida
Agricultural pest nematodes
Vegetable diseases